Kentucky Route 1682 (KY 1682) is an east–west state highway that traverses central and eastern Christian County in western Kentucky.

Route description 
KY 1682 begins on the west side of Hopkinsville as the Hopkinsville By-Pass north of U.S. Route 68 (US 68). It originates at the crossroads of US 68/KY 80, the US 68 By-Pass south of the main route, and itself.

KY 1682 bypasses the northern outskirts of Hopkinsville, intersecting KY 91 and KY 109, as well as US 41 and I-169. The bypass ends at a junction with KY 107, but KY 1682 turns onto KY 107 for about  before turning off.

KY 1682 continues northeast of Hopkinsville as Antioch Church Road, going parallel to KY 107, and it terminates at a junction with KY 189 just southeast of Fearsville.

Together, with US 68 Bypass, it creates a partial beltway around Hopkinsville.

Major intersections

References

1682
Transportation in Christian County, Kentucky